Grotto Point Light, also known as Port Jackson Entrance Range Front Light, is an active lighthouse located at Grotto Point, a rocky headland at the southernmost tip of Balgowlah Heights, New South Wales, Australia, on the north side of Sydney Harbour. It serves as the front range light, Rosherville Light serving as the rear light, into Port Jackson. Rosherville Light is located almost exactly  ( to be exact) behind Grotto Point Light.

History 

The decision to build the range lights was taken in 1909. Construction began in 1910 and the light was first lit on September 1, 1911. It is one of four lighthouses in a style sometimes called "Disney Castle", the others being Rosherville Light, Vaucluse Bay Range Front Light and Vaucluse Bay Range Rear Light.

The original light source was a carbide lamp (acetylene gas) which was initially generated on-site, and later replaced by compressed gas cylinders brought by boat.

Later, the light was electrified and connected to the mains electricity.

Structure 
The structure is a masonry and brick domed tower, attached to two barrel-vaulted service sections in decreasing heights, all painted white. The structure is surrounded by a white picket fence. The light is shone through a  horizontal slit, about two-thirds of the way up the tower.

The lens is a catadioptric apparatus.

Site operation 
The light is operated by the Sydney Ports corporation while the site is managed by the Department of Environment, Climate Change and Water as part of the Sydney Harbour National Park.

Visiting 
The site is accessible by a short hike from Castle Rock track. The grounds are open but the tower is closed to the public.

See also 

 List of lighthouses in Australia

References and notes

External links 
 
 
 
  [CC-By-SA]

Lighthouses completed in 1910
Lighthouses in Sydney
1911 establishments in Australia